Clayton Bezerra Leite (born 3 July 1987), known as Clayton, is a Brazilian football player who plays for Sport Benfica e Castelo Branco.

Club career
He made his professional debut in the Segunda Liga for Feirense on 11 August 2012 in a game against Belenenses.

References

External links

1987 births
Footballers from São Paulo (state)
Living people
Brazilian footballers
Brazilian expatriate footballers
Saigon FC players
C.D. Feirense players
U.D. Oliveirense players
G.D. Chaves players
Académico de Viseu F.C. players
Sport Benfica e Castelo Branco players
V.League 2 players
Liga Portugal 2 players
Association football midfielders
Brazilian expatriate sportspeople in Vietnam
Brazilian expatriate sportspeople in Portugal
Expatriate footballers in Vietnam
Expatriate footballers in Portugal
People from Diadema